The Shamshir,  also Shamsher and Shamsheer, is a type of sword

Shamshir may also refer to:

Weapon systems
 PNS Shamsheer, the name of three ships of the Pakistan Navy
 IRIS Shamshir, a ship of the Iranian Navy
 Shamsher, the name given to the SEPECAT Jaguar in Indian Air Force service

People
 Baber Shamsher Jang Bahadur Rana (1888–1960), the last Minister of Defense of Nepal from the Rana dynasty
 Bir Shamsher Jang Bahadur (1852–1901), the third Prime Minister of Nepal from the Rana Dynasty
 Bir Shamsher Jang Bahadur Rana (1852–1901), the third Prime Minister of Nepal from the Rana dynasty
 Chandra Shamsher Jang Bahadur Rana (1863–1929), the fifth Prime Minister of Nepal from the Rana dynasty
 Dev Shamsher Jang Bahadur Rana (born 1862), Prime Minister of Nepal
 Kaiser Shamsher Jang Bahadur Rana (1892–1964), field marshal in the Royal Nepalese Army
 Kiran Shamsher Rana (1916–1983), Nepalese army officer
 Mohan Shamsher Jang Bahadur Rana (1885–1967), the prime minister and foreign minister of Nepal
 Shamsher Singh Sheri (1942–2005), communist leader in India
 Subarna Shamsher Rana (1910–1977), leading figure in the movement to overthrow the ruling Rana autocracy and to establish democracy in Nepal
 Shamsheer Singh Manhas (born 1960), Indian Member of Parliament
 Shamsheer Vayalil (born 1977), Indian physician, entrepreneur and philanthropist

Places and settlements
 Shamshir, Iran, a village in Kermanshah Province, Iran
 Shamshir Rural District, an administrative subdivision in Kermanshah Province, Iran
 Shamsher Nagar, Moulvibazar, Bangladesh

Other
 Shamshir (horse) (born 1988), British-trained Thoroughbred racehorse